Inga Češulienė (née Čilvinaitė; born 14 February 1986) is a Lithuanian racing cyclist, who currently rides for UCI Women's Continental Team . In 2014, Češulienė was disqualified for a positive doping control for octopamine.

Major results

2005
National Road Championships
1st  Road Race
2nd Time Trial

2006
6th UEC European Cycling Championships, Road Race

2007
2nd Kontich
2nd Veurne-Bulskamp

2008
1st Massemen
2nd National Road Championships, Road Race

2009
1st Hoogstraten-Wortel

2010
1st Stage 2a Trophée d'Or Féminin

2011
2nd National Road Championships, Road Race

2012
1st  National Road Championships, Road Race
1st Stage 3 Giro della Toscana Int. Femminile
2nd GP Liberazione

2013
1st  National Road Championships, Time Trial
1st  Overall Vuelta Internacional Femenina a Costa Rica
1st Stages 2 & 4
8th Overall Giro della Toscana Int. Femminile
9th Overall Vuelta Ciclista Femenina a el Salvador

2014
1st Stage 5 Vuelta Ciclista Femenina a el Salvador

2019
3rd National Road Championships, Road Race

2020
1st  National Road Championships, Road Race
3rd National Road Championships, Time Trial

2021
1st  National Road Championships, Road Race
1st  National Road Championships, Time Trial
7th Overall Giro della Toscana Int. Femminile 

2023
3rd National Road Championships, Road Race
1st  National Road Championships, Time Trial

References

External links
 

1986 births
Living people
Lithuanian female cyclists
Sportspeople from Vilnius
Lithuanian sportspeople in doping cases